Anthidium diadema is a species of bee in the family Megachilidae, the leaf-cutter, carder, or mason bees.

Synonyms
Synonyms for this species include:
Anthidium albiventre Latreille, 1809
Anthidium ornatum Lepeletier, 1841
Anthidium radoszkowskyi Mocsáry, 1887
Anthidium seraxense Radoszkowski, 1893
Anthidium terminale_homonym Morawitz, 1894
Anthidium diadema var obscurum Friese, 1897
Anthidium diadema var caucasicum_homonym Friese, 1897

References

diadema
Insects described in 1809